Li Da (2 October 1890 – 24 August 1966) was a Chinese Marxist philosopher. He led the Publicity Department of the Chinese Communist Party after the foundation of the party. Li left the Chinese Communist Party in the 1920s due to what he viewed as its turn to reformism. However, he maintained close ties with the party and its underground apparatus. Li translated many European Marxist works into Chinese. Li's most important work was Elements of Sociology, which had a great influence on Mao Zedong. Li helped popularize the New Philosophy that gained dominance in the Soviet Union in the 1930s. After the People's Republic of China was established in 1949, Li rejoined the Chinese Communist Party. He was heavily criticized and beaten at the beginning of the Cultural Revolution, and died in 1966. He was posthumously rehabilitated after Mao's death.

Family 
Li was married to Wang Huiwu and they had three children. Their eldest daughter, Li Xintian, died of an illness during the Second Sino-Japanese War. Their second daughter was Li Xinyi. Their only son was Li Xintian, who helped introduce and develop medical psychology in China.

References 

1890 births
1966 deaths
20th-century Chinese translators
Burials at Babaoshan Revolutionary Cemetery
Chinese publishers (people)
Delegates to the 1st National Congress of the Chinese Communist Party
Delegates to the 2nd National Congress of the Chinese Communist Party
Educators from Hunan
Academic staff of Guangxi University
Heads of the Publicity Department of the Chinese Communist Party
Academic staff of Jinan University
National Wuhan University alumni
People from Yongzhou
People persecuted to death during the Cultural Revolution
People's Republic of China translators
Philosophers from Hunan
Presidents of Wuhan University
Presidents of Hunan University
Republic of China translators
Second Sino-Japanese War refugees
Academic staff of Sun Yat-sen University
Translators to Chinese
Writers from Hunan